Becky (Gibbs) Lavelle (born December 5, 1974) is a former professional triathlete, race director, competitive runner, and coach. As a professional triathlete, she has had over 50 career wins in Olympic and Half-Ironman distance races.

Early life
Becky showed strong athletic promise from a young age. She started swimming competitively in Minnesota when she was nine and excelled in the pool throughout high school.

At the age of 12, Becky was named best swimmer of her age group in Minnesota, a title she maintained for seven years. In 1993, during her senior year of high school, she was named (overall) Female Swimmer of the Year for Minnesota.

Becky went on to swim competitively at Louisiana State University (LSU) in college. Her collegiate swim career proved similarly illustrious, and before graduating, Becky had cemented herself as a ten-time NCAA All-American swimmer. Becky was crowned SEC Champion in 200y breaststroke, in 1996 during her junior year. Then in 1997, she was named NCAA state-level "Woman of the Year" for Louisiana, based on her athletic and academic achievements as well as her commitment to serving her community. Despite the stresses that would accompany achieving these high goals, in 1998 Becky graduated summa cum laude with a B.S. in kinesiology.

Before her collegiate career was even halfway over, Becky also got the itch to try a new sport – triathlon.

Triathlon career beginnings
Becky took her initial stab at a triathlon in college. During her first event, Becky exited the water with a significant lead that helped her win fifth place overall. Before graduating college, she successfully competed in a few more triathlons, including the ITU Age-Group World Championship. This newfound excitement for triathlon, coupled with the success she already had achieved in the sport, kickstarted her career as a professional triathlete - a career that would span nearly two decades.

Triathlon career highlights
Some of her career highlights as a member of the US National Triathlon Team are as follows: 
In 2003, Becky was crowned the PanAm Games Bronze medallist.
In 2005, Triathlete magazine designated Becky the "Comeback Athlete of the Year" after she won several big races, including the US National Championships and the Chicago Triathlon. 
In 2006 and 2008, Becky was named Multi-sport Athlete of the Year by USA Triathlon.
Again, in 2007, Lavelle won the US Long Distance Triathlon National Championships.  
In 2008, the same year she secured her spot as an alternate on the US Olympic team in Beijing, she was named the Overall Lifetime Fitness Triathlon Series winner.
In 2012, Becky officially retired from the sport of triathlon but went out with a bang, winning her final half-ironman distance competition, the Rev3 Florida Half-Ironman in Venice, FL.

Jenny's Light
In 2008, Becky Lavelle co-founded the non-profit organization Jenny's Light in honor of her late sister Jenny and her sister's baby boy Graham. Jenny's Light's mission is to improve and save lives by increasing awareness of all perinatal mood disorders, including postpartum depression. Jenny's Light has now joined forces with San Jose, CA based Supporting Mamas (supportingmamas.org) who has a similar mission. Additionally, the annual Jenny's Light Run (10K, 5K, and kids run) held in May in Los Gatos, CA helps raise funds for this very important cause. The organization has raised over $300,000, which they donated to other organizations aiming similarly to raise awareness around postpartum depression and to support mothers who suffer from the debilitating condition.

Running after triathlon
After a few years of official retirement from triathlon and following the birth of her second child, Becky started running with Arete, a women's running club based in Santa Cruz, CA.

Master's running personal records

Notable triathlon accomplishments

References

1974 births
Living people
People from Minnetonka, Minnesota
Sportspeople from Minnesota
American female triathletes
21st-century American women